Aldin Ðidić (born 30 August 1983) is a Bosnian-Herzegovinian former professional footballer who played as a defender.

Club career
Đidić was born in Zenica. He had his biggest success with Kazakhstani club FC Shakhter Karagandy, winning the Kazakhstan Premier League in 2011 and 2012, the Kazakhstan Cup in 2013 and the Kazakhstan Super Cup in 2013.

Career statistics

Honours
Shakhter Karagandy
Kazakhstan Premier League: 2011, 2012
Kazakhstan Cup: 2013
Kazakhstan Super Cup: 2013

References

External links
 

1983 births
Living people
Sportspeople from Zenica
Bosnia and Herzegovina footballers
Association football central defenders
NK Čelik Zenica players
HŠK Posušje players
NK Žepče players
NK IB 1975 Ljubljana players
FC KAMAZ Naberezhnye Chelny players
FC Baltika Kaliningrad players
FC Shakhter Karagandy players
FK Sloboda Tuzla players
Premier League of Bosnia and Herzegovina players
Slovenian PrvaLiga players
Russian First League players
Kazakhstan Premier League players
Bosnia and Herzegovina expatriate footballers
Expatriate footballers in Slovenia
Bosnia and Herzegovina expatriate sportspeople in Slovenia
Expatriate footballers in Russia
Bosnia and Herzegovina expatriate sportspeople in Russia
Expatriate footballers in Kazakhstan
Bosnia and Herzegovina expatriate sportspeople in Kazakhstan